IY, I-Y, or iY may refer to:
 Imperial Yeomanry, a British cavalry force (1899–1908)
 InuYasha, a long-running manga and anime series by Rumiko Takahashi
 Saudi–Iraqi neutral zone (FIPS 10-4 digram; obsolete since 1993)
 Ito-Yokado, a Japanese general merchandise store, member of the Seven & I Holdings Co. (IY-Group)

Merchandise Store, which is a member of IY-Group
 Yemenia (IATA airline designator)
 Generation iY, the demographic cohort following Generation X, specifically referring to those born after 1990
 Invincible Youth, a South Korean variety show